Yes or No? is a 1920 American silent drama film directed by Roy William Neill and starring Norma Talmadge in a duo role. It is based on the 1917 Broadway play Yes or No by Arthur Goodrich.  Talmadge and Joe Schenck produced the picture and released it through First National Exhibitors.

It is preserved at the Library of Congress Packard Campus for Audio-Visual Conservation.

Plot

Cast
Norma Talmadge as Margaret Vane / Minnie Berry
Frederick Burton as Donald Vane
Lowell Sherman as Paul Derreck
Lionel Adams as Dr. Malloy
Rockliffe Fellowes as Jack Berry
Natalie Talmadge as Emma Martin
Edward Brophy as Tom Martin (credited as Edward S. Brophy)
Dudley Clements as Horace Hooker
Gladden James as Ted Leach

References

External links

 

Lobby poster featuring the likenesses of Norma Talmadge and Gladden James

1920 films
1920s English-language films
American silent feature films
Films directed by Roy William Neill
American films based on plays
1920 drama films
Silent American drama films
American black-and-white films
Surviving American silent films
1920s American films